Namsky District (Nam uluuha) is an administrative and municipal district (raion, or ulus), one of the thirty-four in the Sakha Republic, Russia. The district is located in the center of the republic and borders Ust-Aldansky District in the east, Megino-Kangalassky District in the southeast, the territory of the city of republic significance of Yakutsk in the south, Gorny District in the west, and Kobyaysky District in the north. Its administrative center is the rural locality (a selo) of Namtsy. As of the 2010 Census, the total population of the district was 23,198, with the population of Namtsy accounting for 38.3% of that number.

Geography
The landscape of the district is the flat territory of the Central Yakutian Lowland. The main river is the Lena with its tributaries, such as the Kenkeme and Khanchaly.

Climate

History
The district was established on February 10, 1930.

Administrative and municipal status
Within the framework of administrative divisions, Namsky District is one of the thirty-four in the republic. It is divided into eighteen rural okrugs (naslegs), which comprise twenty-three rural localities; as well as the selo of Grafsky Bereg, which is not a part of any rural okrug. As a municipal division, the district is incorporated as Namsky Municipal District. The eighteen rural okrugs and the selo of Grafsky Bereg are incorporated into nineteen rural settlements within the municipal district. The selo of Namtsy serves as the administrative center of both the administrative and municipal district.

Inhabited localities

Demographics 
A bulk of the district's population are Yakuts (96.7%); Russians account for about 2% and others ethnicities—for 1.3%.

Notable people
Aita Shaposhnikova, poet

References

Notes

Sources
Official website of the Sakha Republic. Registry of the Administrative-Territorial Divisions of the Sakha Republic. Namsky District. 

Districts of the Sakha Republic
States and territories established in 1930